Schausinna is a genus of moths in the family Lasiocampidae. The genus was erected by Per Olof Christopher Aurivillius in 1909.

Species
Species of this genus are:
Schausinna affinis Aurivillius, 1910
Schausinna clementsi (Schaus, 1897)
Schausinna regia (Grünberg, 1910)

References

Lasiocampidae